The IEEE Donald O. Pederson Award in Solid-State Circuits is a Technical Field Award of the Institute of Electrical and Electronics Engineers (IEEE). It was previously called the IEEE Solid-State Circuits Award. In November 2005 the award was renamed to honor Donald O. Pederson. He was one of the co-founders of the IEEE Solid-State Circuits Council, and was a driving force behind the initiation of the IEEE Journal of Solid-State Circuits.

Recipients of this award receive a bronze medal, a certificate and an honorarium.

This award is given for "outstanding contributions to solid-state circuits, as exemplified by benefit to society, enhancement to technology, and professional leadership". The award may be presented to an individual, or a team of up to three people.

Recipients 
The following people received this award as the IEEE Donald O. Pederson Award in Solid-State Circuits:

 2021: A. Paul Brokaw
 2020: Klaas Bult
 2019: Laurence W. Nagel
 2018: William S. Carter
 2018: Stephen M. Trimberger
 2017: Takao Nishitani
 2017: John S. Thompson
 2016: Miles A. Copeland
 2015: Robert Whitlock Adams
 2014: Robert G. Meyer
 2013: Anantha P. Chandrakasan
 2012: Behzad Razavi
 2011: Willy Sansen
 2010: Takayasu Sakurai
 2009: Teresa H. Meng
 2008: Asad A. Abidi
 2007: Hugo De Man
 2006: Mark A. Horowitz	

The following people received this award as the IEEE Solid-State Circuits Award:

 2005: Bruce A. Wooley		
 2004: Eric A. Vittoz	
 2003: Daniel W. Dobberpuhl	
 2002: Ping-Keung Ko	
 2002: Chenming Calvin Hu
 2001: No Award
 2000: Hung-Fai (Stephen) Law	
 2000: Robert H. Krambeck	
 1999: Kensall D. Wise		
 1998: Nicky C. Lu
 1997: Robert W. Brodersen
 1996: Rudy J. van de Plassche	
 1995: Lewis M. Terman		
 1994: Paul R. Gray		
 1993: Kiyoo Itoh		
 1992: Barrie Gilbert		
 1991: Frank Wanlass		
 1990: Toshiaki Masuhara	
 1989: James D. Meindl

References 

Donald O. Pederson Award in Solid-State Circuits
Awards established in 1987